Sechtem station is a through station in the district of Sechtem of the town of Bornheim in the German state of North Rhine-Westphalia. It was opened on 1 March 1844 on the Left Rhine line, which was opened between Cologne and Bonn by the Bonn–Cologne Railway Company on 15 February 1844. It has three platform tracks and it is classified by Deutsche Bahn as a category 5 station.

The station is served by the following two lines:

It is also served by bus route 818, operated by Regionalverkehr Köln at 60-minute intervals.

References

Railway stations in North Rhine-Westphalia
Railway stations in Germany opened in 1844
1844 establishments in Prussia
Buildings and structures in Rhein-Sieg-Kreis